José Luis Figuereo Franco, better known by the stage name El Barrio, is a Spanish new flamenco singer. He was born on 4 June 1970 in Cádiz, Santa María. 

Figuereo is known as a multi-artist from Andalucía. He is not only a singer-songwriter, but is also a composer and a poet. In his music, he uses old flamenco techniques, as well as new. 

His poetic style offers a fresh take on flamenco. The lyrics of his songs define an urban flamenco, with conceptual and emotional subjects. His language is lyrical, youthful, and modern, employing slang and even gypsy expressions into his work.

This poetic style is reminiscent of the great Spanish flamenco singers. He has first-class use of his throat when singing.

His poetry is evocative of the poetry from the Generation of '27, from the surrealism of Alberti, to the more gypsy Federico García Lorca and the passionate Miguel Hernández.

José Luis Figuereo, Selu, El Barrio, is an urban poet of the 21st century for his fans, he has connected very well with them, even more with the young fans who already like flamenco.

Discography
 1996 - Yo Sueño Flamenco
 1998 - Mi Secreto
 1999 - Mal de Amores
 2000 - La Fuente del Deseo
 2002 - Me Voy Al Mundo
 2003 - Angel Malherido
 2005 - Las Playas de Invierno
 2006 - Toda una Década
 2007 - La Voz de Mi Silencio
 2009 - Duermevela
 2010 - Al sur de la Atlántida
 2011 - Espejos
 2012 - Hasta el fin de los tiempo
 2014 - Hijo del Levante
 2017 - Las costuras del alma
 2019 - El Danzar de las Mariposas
 2022 - Atemporal

External links
 
El Barrio's biography and discography
Elbarrioflamenco.es

Spanish folk music groups